María Elena Giusti Lugo (born November 13, 1968) is a retired synchronized swimmer from Venezuela.

She represented her country in the women's solo competition at the 1988 and 1992 Summer Olympics but failed to reach the medal podium; and at the latter sporting event, she was the Olympic flag bearer for Venezuela.

At the 1991 and 1995 Pan American Games, she won a silver and a bronze medal respectively; and she also competed at the 1991 and 1994 World Aquatics Championships.

References

1968 births
Living people
Venezuelan synchronized swimmers
Olympic synchronized swimmers of Venezuela
Synchronized swimmers at the 1988 Summer Olympics
Synchronized swimmers at the 1992 Summer Olympics
Synchronized swimmers at the 1991 World Aquatics Championships
Pan American Games silver medalists for Venezuela
Pan American Games bronze medalists for Venezuela
Pan American Games medalists in synchronized swimming
Synchronized swimmers at the 1991 Pan American Games
Synchronized swimmers at the 1995 Pan American Games
Medalists at the 1991 Pan American Games
Medalists at the 1995 Pan American Games